Gremolata or gremolada is a green sauce made of chopped parsley, lemon zest, and garlic. It is the standard accompaniment to the Milanese braised veal shank dish ossobuco alla milanese.

Ingredients
Gremolata usually includes grated lemon peel, although the zest from other citrus fruits (lime, orange, grapefruit, etc.) may be used. There are also other variations, such as leaving out the herbs (parsley, cilantro/coriander, mint, sage) or the feature (garlic, finely grated fresh horseradish, minced shallot), or adding another item (Pecorino Romano cheese, anchovy, toasted pine nuts, grated bottarga).

See also

 Chimichurri
 Persillade, a sauce made from parsley and garlic
 Pesto
 Pistou

References

Italian sauces
Anchovy dishes